Henry Blackman or Henry Blackmon (September 19, 1891 – August 8, 1924) was an American Negro league third baseman in the 1920s.

A native of Hillsboro, Texas, Blackman played for the Indianapolis ABCs from 1920 to 1924, and for the Baltimore Black Sox in 1924. Blackman played third base and was stated to be a dependable .300 hitter, earning a salary of $180 per month. Blackman died in Baltimore, Maryland in 1924 at age 32.

References

External links
 and Baseball-Reference Black Baseball stats and Seamheads 
 Henry Blackman at Negro Leagues Baseball Museum

1891 births
1924 deaths
Baltimore Black Sox players
Indianapolis ABCs players
20th-century African-American sportspeople
Baseball infielders
People from Hillsboro, Texas